Gajendra, meaning 'lord of elephants', is a term referring to Airavata, the elephant of Lord Indra, as believed in Hinduism.

Gajendra may also refer to:

Gajendra Moksha, a scriptural tale about the Hindu god Vishnu rescuing an elephant
Gajendra (1984 film)
Gajendra (2004 film)